Rick Glassman (born July 23, 1984) is an American actor and comedian.

Glassman starred in the role of Burski on the NBC sitcom Undateable and wrote, directed and starred in the NBC-produced web series spin-off The Sixth Lead. He played the role of Harold Ramis in the film A Futile and Stupid Gesture, a biopic about the National Lampoon, and starred in the Amazon Prime Video comedy drama series As We See It.

Early life
Glassman was born in Shaker Heights, Ohio, a suburb of Cleveland, and grew up in the suburb of Orange. His father, Steve, was a restaurateur before becoming part owner of a carpet store in Mayfield Heights in the late 1990s. His father is Jewish and his mother is of Italian descent.

Glassman attended Orange High School, graduating in 2002. He was on the high school basketball team and played against the St. Vincent–St. Mary High School team, which was led at the time by LeBron James. He graduated from Kent State University in 2006 with a degree in marketing. He was also taking theater classes while at school. After graduation, Glassman considered going to law school, but started performing stand-up comedy, first performing at the Cleveland Improv in 2007.

Career
Glassman moved to Los Angeles in 2008 where he continued to perform stand-up comedy. His career gained traction after performing regularly at The Comedy Store. In 2013, he was invited to the New Faces showcase at Just for Laughs comedy festival. He appeared in an episode of Adam Devine's House Party in the show's second season.

Writer-producer Bill Lawrence invited Glassman and fellow comedian Brent Morin to audition for his sitcom Undateable after watching both comedians perform at the Hollywood Improv. Glassman and Morin each won roles in the show, which also stars Chris D'Elia, Ron Funches and David Fynn. Glassman played the part of Burski, a regular patron of the bar owned by Morin's character. While working on the show, Glassman pitched an idea to Lawrence that became the NBC-produced web series spin-off The Sixth Lead. Written, directed by, and starring Glassman, The Sixth Lead follows him during his day-to-day experiences as "the sixth lead" in Undateables cast. Similar in style to the series Curb Your Enthusiasm, the series provides the viewer with a semi-fictionalized, behind-the-scenes look at Undateables production and includes appearances by Lawrence and other cast members, as well as appearances by Zach Braff as himself. Glassman edited the series into a short film that won Best Short Film at the 2016 IFS Festival, held by the Independent Filmmakers Showcase in Los Angeles.

Glassman was a guest star on the 2015 series The Comedians, in the role of Clifford, and played the role of Harold Ramis in the 2018 biopic A Futile and Stupid Gesture.

In 2019 he launched his podcast, Take Your Shoes Off. The show mainly features interviews comedians and others in the entertainment industry, sometimes featuring scenes briefly superimposed with digital animation or dramatized scenes between himself and his guests for comedic effect. His show also features advertisements directed by Glassman for Marshall Carpet One and Rug Gallery, the carpet store co-owned by his father.

In 2022, Glassman starred in the comedy drama series As We See It.  Based on the Israeli series On the Spectrum, the show revolves around the lives of three roommates who are autistic. The roommates are played by actors on the autism spectrum, including Glassman, who was diagnosed with autism in adulthood. He also stars as Edward in the ABC sitcom Not Dead Yet, which premiered in February 2023. Glassman's character is autistic and is the roommate of the character played by the show's lead Gina Rodriguez.

Personal life
Glassman was diagnosed with level 1 autism (formerly known as Asperger syndrome) in the late 2010s. He told Forbes that, since his diagnosis, "All of these seemingly unrelated obstacles became patterns that made sense... It's something that I was and am proud of."

Filmography

Television

Film

References

External links

21st-century American comedians
American podcasters
American stand-up comedians
Comedians from Ohio
Kent State University alumni
Jewish American comedians
Jewish American male actors
Living people
People from Ohio
Actors with autism
1984 births